Satpal Singh (born 1 February 1955), also known as Guru Satpal, is a wrestling coach and former wrestler of India. He was a Gold Medalist in 1982 Asian Games and a Bronze medalist in 1974 Asian Games. Today he is better known as the coach of Olympic medal winners Sushil Kumar and Ravi Kumar Dahiya.

He was awarded Padma Bhushan, the third highest civilian award of India, in 2015.

Biography
Satpal was born on 1 February 1955 in Bawana village in Delhi. He was coached by the famous wrestling coach Guru Hanuman at Hanuman Akhara, Delhi. He was Indian national champion for 16 years. 
He achieved international success at commonwealth games winning 3 silver medals in 1974, 1978 and 1982 commonwealth games. In Asian Games too, he improved his performance at successive games, winning a bronze in 1974, a silver in 1978 and peaked with a gold in 1982. 
Satpal was also good in traditional kushti. He won several titles like Bharat Kumar (1973), Rustom-e-Hind (1974 and 1975), Bharat Kesari (1975), Rustom-e-Bharat (1975), Maha Bharat Kesari (1976), Mahan Bharat Kesari (1976), Rustom-e-Zaman (1976), Hind Kesari (1977), Bharat Shri (1978) and Bharat Balram (1979).

Satpal now works as Assistant Director of Education, Delhi. He is also the Chief Patron of School Games Federation of India. He runs an Akhada for coaching of wrestling with fellow coach Virender Singh from 1988 in Chhatrasal Stadium in Delhi. He trained two time Olympic medal winner, Sushil Kumar for the Beijing Olympics 2008 and London Olympics 2012.

He was awarded Dronacharya Award in 2009 by the Indian Government. He was earlier conferred the Arjuna Award in 1974 and the Padma Shri in 1983.

Awards and achievements

 1974:Arjun Award (Wrestling)
 1983:Padma Shri
 2009:Dronacharya Award
 National Heavyweight Champion 16 times.
 2015: Padma Bhushan

Participation
 Wrestling at the 1980 Summer Olympics - Men's freestyle 100 kg

Notes

References

Olympic wrestlers of India
Indian wrestling coaches
1955 births
Living people
People from Delhi
Wrestlers at the 1974 British Commonwealth Games
Wrestlers at the 1978 Commonwealth Games
Wrestlers at the 1982 Commonwealth Games
Commonwealth Games silver medallists for India
Wrestlers at the 1972 Summer Olympics
Wrestlers at the 1980 Summer Olympics
Indian male sport wrestlers
Recipients of the Padma Shri in sports
Recipients of the Arjuna Award
Recipients of the Dronacharya Award
Asian Games gold medalists for India
Sport wrestlers from Delhi
Asian Games medalists in wrestling
Wrestlers at the 1974 Asian Games
Wrestlers at the 1978 Asian Games
Wrestlers at the 1982 Asian Games
Recipients of the Padma Bhushan in sports
Asian Games silver medalists for India
Asian Games bronze medalists for India
Commonwealth Games medallists in wrestling
Medalists at the 1974 Asian Games
Medalists at the 1978 Asian Games
Medalists at the 1982 Asian Games
Medallists at the 1974 British Commonwealth Games
Medallists at the 1978 Commonwealth Games
Medallists at the 1982 Commonwealth Games